The Extraordinary and Plenipotentiary Ambassador of Peru to the Republic of Turkey is the official representative of the Republic of Peru to the Republic of Turkey.

Relations between both states date back to the Ottoman Empire, with the most recent establishment of relations being in 1952. In 2010, a Peruvian embassy was opened in Ankara, and a Turkish embassy was opened in Lima.

The ambassador to Turkey is also accredited to Georgia and Azerbaijan since 2011. Peru opened an embassy on August 2, 2017 (concurrent with Georgia), which closed in 2020 (reaccrediting the ambassador in Ankara to said countries). In Georgia, an honorary consulate was opened on August 23, 2018.

List of representatives

See also
List of ambassadors of Turkey to Peru
List of ambassadors of Peru to Greece
List of ambassadors of Peru to Russia

Notes

References

Turkey
Peru